Scopula complanata is a moth of the family Geometridae. It was described by Warren in 1896. It is found in India (Assam).

References

Moths described in 1896
Moths of Asia
complanata
Taxa named by William Warren (entomologist)